Diego Antonio Fuentes Lopez, known as Diego Fuentes, is a Canadian actor of Chilean descent and Toronto socialite.

MuchMusic
Fuentes was MuchMusic's first ever VJ Search winner in 1995, going on to host the popular Clip Trip show on MuchMusic's sister station, MuchMoreMusic.

Acting
Most notably, Fuentes portrayed real-life actor Natividad Vacio in the 2007 film Hollywoodland. He played fan-favourite Bruno Dias on Global TV's medical drama, Remedy from 2014 to 2015.

In 2011, he appeared in the Drive One Series commercials of Ford Cars, stating the catchphrase "Who wants to stop for gas? I don't."

Music
Fuentes was a resident DJ on "Terrible Tuesdays" at the then popular Queenshead Pub in Toronto from 2003 to 2005. He originally performed under his own name, then adopted the moniker "Mexico 2000".

Curling
Fuentes is a highly skilled curler. In high school, he and his school curling team competed at OFSAA.

On May 12, 2012, Fuentes was lead skip of a local curling team that won the Gabby's 2012 annual Bonspiel held at the High Park Curling Club. The team completed the tournament with 4 wins, 0 losses and 0 ties.

In January 2016, Fuentes stated in an interview that "curling is an incredible sport because drinking is involved".

Advocacy and public service
Fuentes is a known advocate for customer rights in fast food restaurants and taxi services in the Greater Toronto Area, as well as a staunch supporter of water conservation.

Throughout 2015, he championed a campaign to feed the homeless and clean up Toronto city streets known as "Mexico's Children".  In early December, there was an incident outside a Toronto Coffee Time where he was reportedly spit on after offering a woman a bagel with cream cheese.  The police were called but no charges or arrests were made.

Filmography
 Ice (1998 TV) as Zapata
 Love Thy Neighbor
 Remedy (TV series) (2014 TV)
 Caught (2018) as Lt. Carillo

References

External links

Much (TV channel) personalities
Living people
Year of birth missing (living people)
Canadian VJs (media personalities)
Canadian male voice actors
Canadian male television actors
Canadian male film actors